Maulisia is a genus of tubeshoulders.

Species
There are currently five recognized species in this genus:
 Maulisia acuticeps Sazonov, 1976 (Sharpsnout tubeshoulder)
 Maulisia argipalla Matsui & Rosenblatt, 1979 (Palegold searsid)
 Maulisia isaacsi Matsui & Rosenblatt, 1987
 Maulisia mauli A. E. Parr, 1960 (Maul's searsid)
 Maulisia microlepis Sazonov & Golovan, 1976 (Smallscale searsid)

References

Platytroctidae
Ray-finned fish genera